Montara is a census-designated place (CDP) in San Mateo County, California, United States. The population was 2,833 at the 2020 census.  Nearby communities include Moss Beach and Princeton-by-the-Sea.

Etymology

According to historical sources, the name "Montoro" was initially used for Montara Mountain and Montara Point by the Whitney Survey, also known as the California Geological Survey, in 1867. In 1869, the United States Coast Survey referred to the area with its current name. The name is thought to be a misspelling of several Spanish words that describe mountains and forests, such as montuoso, montaraz, and montaña. It could also refer to a corruption of the Spanish word "Montosa"; "Cañada Montosa" (valley of brush) was allegedly written on an 1838 design of Rancho San Pedro, located in Southern California, but the connections between this plan and the town are unclear.

Geography and environment
Neighboring towns include Pacifica to the north, Moss Beach, El Granada, and Half Moon Bay to the south.

The mountain is accessible by a gravel fire road. On a few occasions light snowfall has fallen on the upper reaches of the mountain.

The town is surrounded by open space (Rancho Corral de Tierra) and a popular recreation area includes Montara State Beach. It is, however, a fairly popular surfing destination for experienced surfers. Waves of at least  can be common during winter storm swells.

Montara State Marine Reserve & Pillar Point State Marine Conservation Area extend offshore from Montara.  Like underwater parks, these marine protected areas help conserve ocean wildlife and marine ecosystems.

Climate

Montara enjoys exceptionally mild weather throughout the year. Due to its proximity to the Pacific Ocean, heavy fogs and low overcasts are common throughout the year, sometimes producing light drizzle. Stray showers sometimes occur during the mostly dry summer months. January, the coldest month, normally has high temperatures in the upper fifties (~14 °C) and low temperatures in the middle forties (~8 °C). Freezing temperatures are extremely rare, especially near the ocean. September, the warmest month, normally has high temperatures in the upper sixties (~20 °C) and lows in the lower fifties (~11 °C). Temperatures rarely exceed , and whenever there are daytime temperatures above , it still cools to the fifties (~13 °C) at night. The nearest official National Weather Service station is at Half Moon Bay. Recently, an automated weather station was set up in Montara, providing regular observations on the National Weather Service's website, weather.gov.

Demographics

2010
The 2010 United States Census reported that Montara had a population of 2,909. The racial makeup of Montara was 2,491 (85.6%) White, 16 (0.6%) African American, 21 (0.7%) Native American, 142 (4.9%) Asian, 1 (0.0%) Pacific Islander, 97 (3.3%) from other races, and 141 (4.8%) from two or more races. Hispanic or Latino of any race were 324 persons (11.1%).

The Census reported that 2,909 people (100% of the population) lived in households, 0 (0%) lived in non-institutionalized group quarters, and 0 (0%) were institutionalized.

There were 1,109 households, out of which 351 (31.7%) had children under the age of 18 living in them, 666 (60.1%) were opposite-sex married couples living together, 77 (6.9%) had a female householder with no husband present, 46 (4.1%) had a male householder with no wife present.  There were 59 (5.3%) unmarried opposite-sex partnerships, and 17 (1.5%) same-sex married couples or partnerships. 209 households (18.8%) were made up of individuals, and 72 (6.5%) had someone living alone who was 65 years of age or older. The average household size was 2.62.  There were 789 families (71.1% of all households); the average family size was 3.02.

The population was spread out, with 617 people (21.2%) under the age of 18, 169 people (5.8%) aged 18 to 24, 622 people (21.4%) aged 25 to 44, 1,145 people (39.4%) aged 45 to 64, and 356 people (12.2%) who were 65 years of age or older.  The median age was 46.0 years. For every 100 females, there were 92.5 males.  For every 100 females age 18 and over, there were 90.0 males.

The homeowner vacancy rate was 0.9%; the rental vacancy rate was 5.3%.  2,409 people (82.8% of the population) lived in owner-occupied housing units and 500 people (17.2%) lived in rental housing units.

2000
As of the census of 2000, there were 2,950 people, 1,010 households, and 756 families residing in the CDP. The racial makeup of the CDP in 2010 was 79.2% non-Hispanic White, 0.5% non-Hispanic African American, 0.3% Native American, 4.8% Asian, 0.2% from other races, and 3.6% from two or more races. Hispanic or Latino of any race were 11.1% of the population.

There were 1,010 households, out of which 40.9% had children under the age of 18 living with them, 63.4% were married couples living together, 7.8% had a female householder with no husband present, and 25.1% were non-families. 15.7% of all households were made up of individuals, and 2.7% had someone living alone who was 65 years of age or older.  The average household size was 2.80 and the average family size was 3.10.

In the CDP, the population was spread out, with 25.4% under the age of 18, 4.7% from 18 to 24, 28.7% from 25 to 44, 32.5% from 45 to 64, and 8.6% who were 65 years of age or older.  The median age was 41 years. For every 100 females, there were 93.2 males.  For every 100 females age 18 and over, there were 93.3 males.

The median income for a household in the CDP was $95,326, and the median income for a family was $100,881. Males had a median income of $67,708 versus $50,704 for females. The per capita income for the CDP was $44,360.  About 0.5% of families and 2.4% of the population were below the poverty line, including 0.5% of those under age 18 and none of those age 65 or over.

Government

Montara is an unincorporated community.  All planning and zoning is the responsibility of the San Mateo County Board of Supervisors, which is elected at large by the voters of San Mateo County. The  Midcoast Community Council is an elected advisory body to the Board of Supervisors, is chosen by residents of Montara, Moss Beach, and El Granada.

Montara is also part of the Cabrillo Unified School District, Coastside Fire Protection District, Montara Water and Sanitary District, and the Midpeninsula Regional Open Space District. Because it is in the coastal zone, Montara is under the jurisdiction of the California Coastal Commission.

History

A lighthouse was established at Point Montara in 1875.  The Montara area was first settled by farmers in the late nineteenth century.  A commercial flower farm, still in operation, was established in 1900.  In 1905, Montara became a stop on the new Ocean Shore Railroad, then under construction.  The railroad built a hotel next to the train station.  The trains encouraged weekend visitors to the area, but development of the community was very slow.  The railroad went bankrupt and ceased operations in 1920, but the hotel remained and, although greatly remodeled, is still standing today, between State Route 1 and Main Street, next to the remodeled train station.

The Montara Grammar School opened in 1915; the historic two-story building still stands, serving as a community center.  The newer Farallone View Elementary School, a few blocks north of the original school, services the town's children today.

California's second paved highway, Pedro Mountain Road, was completed in 1914, providing another connection between Montara and San Francisco.  This highway was replaced in 1937 by State Route 1, which followed the old railroad route through the Devil's Slide. A tunnel was opened in 2013 to replace this dangerous route, which had been closed periodically due to landslides.  The United States Navy operated an anti-aircraft training center at Point Montara during World War II.

Real growth in Montara began in the 1950s as more people moved away from San Francisco during the postwar boom.  As Montara has continued to grow, the community has still maintained its generally rural image.  Most of Montara's streets were dirt or gravel until the early 1990s; the rustic quality of the town has not been lost since the streets were oiled or paved (only some of the streets are actually paved).

Notable 

In 2003, Montara Water and Sanitary District purchased its water system from the German industrial firm RWE.  Montara and Moss Beach residents overwhelmingly supported a bond for the purchase and repair of the system.  The high, spiraling rates and a decades-long water moratorium were key motivations behind the bond measure.

Point Montara Light is a lighthouse in Montara, located just west of the Cabrillo Highway at Point Montara.  Montara Light was originally established in 1875 as a fog signal station after several ships ran ashore in the late 1860s.  The cast-iron lighthouse was brought from Wellfleet Harbor, Cape Cod, Massachusetts in 1925.  It continues to operate as an aid-to-navigation maintained by the U.S. Coast Guard.  The lighthouse demarks the northern point of the Fitzgerald Marine Reserve, a holding of Special Biological Significance owned by the State of California. The lighthouse grounds also serve for an international hostel, Point Montara Lighthouse.

Transportation
Primary road access is via State Route 1 (the Cabrillo Highway) from the north and south.

SamTrans route 117 provides service to Montara with service from Linda Mar in Pacifica to Half Moon Bay.

References

External links
 Coastsider, coastal San Mateo County news site
 Montara.com
  Montara Light (photograph)
  "Point Montara Light Station", California State Parks
 Montara Water and Sanitary District
 Montara Fog
 Montara Beach Coalition
 Montara State Beach - Photo

Populated coastal places in California
Census-designated places in San Mateo County, California
Census-designated places in California